The McNally Robinson Book for Young People Award is associated with the Manitoba Book Awards and was first sponsored by McNally Robinson Booksellers in 1997 and since then has been given in two categories: Young Adult and Children. It is presented to the two Manitoba writers whose books for young people are judged the best written. The two winning authors each receive a cash award.

Winners

Pre 1997 winners

1995 — Margaret Buffie, The Dark Garden
1996 — Margaret Shaw-MacKinnon, Tiktala

Young Adult category

1997 — Diana Wieler, RanVan: Magic Nation
1998 — Diana Wieler, Drive
1999 — Martha Brooks, Being with Henry
2000 — Linda Holeman, Raspberry House Blues
2001 — Eva Wiseman, My Canary Yellow Star
2002 — Linda Holeman, Search of the Moon King’s Daughter
2003 — Duncan Thornton, The Star-Glass
2004 — Margaret Buffie, The Finder 
2005 — Diane Juttner Perreault, Breath of the Dragon
2006 — Larry Verstraete, Lost Treasures: True Stories of Discovery

Children category

1997 — Sheldon Oberman, By the Hanukkah Light
1998 — No award given
1999 — Colleen Sydor, Smarty Pants
2000 — No award given
2001 — Sheldon Oberman, The Wisdom Bird
2002 — No award given
2003 — Connie Colker Steiner, Shoes for Amélie
2004 — No award given
2005 — Colleen Sydor, Camilla Chameleon
2006 — Colleen Sydor, Raising a Little Stink
2022 — Tasha Spillett-Sumner (illustrated by Michaela Goade), I Sang You Down from the Stars

References

External links
The McNally Robinson Book for Young People Award
Manitoba Writing and Publishing Awards - Brave New Words

Canadian children's literary awards
Young adult literature awards
Awards established in 1995
1995 establishments in Manitoba